Jane Richardson Hanks (August 2, 1908 – July 27, 2014) was an American anthropologist particularly known for her work on Native American people and those of Southeast Asia.

Biography
Hanks was born Jane Richardson on August 2, 1908, the daughter of Berkeley Latin professor Leon Josiah Richardson. She got her  bachelor's degree in 1930 from the  University of California, Berkeley. She then met Alfred Kroeber who encouraged her into the field of anthropology. He enrolled her in three undergraduate courses so that she could join the graduate program in anthropology in 1933. Hanks got her PhD from Columbia University in 1943. Although she defended her dissertation in 1938 on Kiowa law, an oversight caused the formal awarding to be delayed. Kroeber was an important mentor to her and she became his research assistant. He also arranged for her field work with Kiowa people and a travelling fellowship. It was this which took her to Columbia University, to study with Ruth Benedict. Her work on the upland tribal people of Thailand and the Akha women was considered pioneering. Hanks believed in the Boasian tenet, approaching anthropology by gathering the data and then producing theories rather than beginning with the theory. Hanks became a research associate at Cornell Research Center and was associate director of Bennington-Cornell Survey of Hill Tribes of North Thailand. She also served as the Peace Corps consultant on Thailand.

Personal life
Hanks met her husband Lucien Mason Hanks on fieldwork. They worked in collaboration on a number of articles and books. The couple lived in Thailand while gaining data to write about its anthropology. They had three sons: Peter, Tobias and Nicholas. While the children were young Hanks was focused on them rather than her anthropology work. She had two great periods of output, before and after the children. Hanks was also a musician and played with her local orchestra. She died at home on July 27, 2014.

Selected works
Reflections on the ontology of rice., 1960 
With Lucien Hanks. Thailand: equality between the sexes., 1963 
With Lucien Hanks. Siamese Tai., 1964 
Recitation of patrilineages among the Akha.,1974  
Hill and valley peoples of Thailand's province of Chiangrai: a changing relationship., 1981 
With Lucien Hanks. Settling the Lisu in Thailand., 1987 
The power of Akha women., 1988 
The Confucian heritage among the tribes., 1990 
Changing configurations in the social organization of a Blackfoot tribe during the reserve period
Ethnographic notes on northern Thailand
Law and status among the Kiowa Indians, c1940
Maternity and its rituals in Bang Chan
Observations on Northern Blackfoot kinship
Tender hearts of India
Three centuries of women's dress fashions a quantitative analysis / by Jane Richardson and A. L. Kroeber. - Berkeley, 1940.
Tribes of the North Thailand frontier

Sources

1908 births
2014 deaths
University of California, Berkeley alumni
Columbia University alumni
American anthropologists
American women anthropologists
21st-century American women